The Ganderbal district, or more formally District Ganderdal, is a district in the union territory of Jammu and Kashmir, India. Ganderbal town is administrative headquarters of district. It was formed in 2007 and has 6 subdistricts (tehsils): Kangan, Ganderbal, Tullamulla, Wakura, Lar, and Gund.

Sheikh Ul Alam Research University of Kashmir will also be constructed in Ganderbal by Karwan-I-Islami

Historic sites and remains

Kheer Bhawani
Kheer Bhawani is a temple dedicated to the goddess Bhavani, constructed over a sacred spring in Tulmul village. The term kheer refers to rice pudding that is offered in the spring to propitiate the Goddess, which became part of the name of the temple. As is the custom with several Hindu deities.

Naranag Temple
The Naranag Temple is one of the important archaeological sites of the country. The ancient name for the place is Sodarteertha; Bhuteshwara (now But Sher, midway on the trek to Gangbal lake) and Nandikshetra (Nundkol lake area) are two other holy sites associated with it. Historians say that the temple is dedicated to Lord Shiva by the eighth-century ruler Lalithdatiya Muktapid. It is believed that the King Awantivarman paid a visit and donated a pedestal for bathing at Bhutsher. Even today one gets surprised over art and skill of the builders of this temple. Its impressive architecture reveals the glorious past, the magnificent art of the eighth century. The government has only recently constructed walls to protect it from encroachments and nothing else has been done. It is now left in ruins of which only faint traces have survived.

Geography

The mountainous Ganderbal district is spread across the Sind River. It is the only river in Jammu and Kashmir on which three hydroelectric power stations are functional; besides that the river provides water for irrigation, 80% population of the district is engaged with farming. The sand (bajri) of this river has a great value for money for its quality.

Harmukh is the highest peak in the region and Gangbal the largest alpine lake.

The district currently has six subdistricts (tehsils):
 Kangan
 Ganderbal
 Tullamulla
 Wakoora
 Lar
 Gund

It is further divided into nine CD blocks: Ganderbal, Wakoora, Lar, Kangan, Gund, Shearpathri, Phaag, Manigam and Batwina. Each block consists of a number of panchayats. Ganderbal District has 2 assembly constituencies: Kangan and Ganderbal.

Demographics 

At the time of the 2011 census, 68.92% of the population spoke Kashmiri, 20.21% Gojri, 3.49% Pashto, 2.61% Pahari and 1.31% Hindi as their first language. Balti and Shina are also spoken by small populations in the high mountains.

Climate
Ganderbal district possesses all the typical characteristics of the climate of Kashmir Valley as a whole. In the heat of July, the breeze of the Sindh River is a welcome relief. Sir Walter Lawrence writes in his book The Valley of Kashmir that in latitude, Kashmir corresponds with Peshawar, Baghdad and Damascus in Asia: with Fez in Morocco: and South Carolina in America, but it presents none of the characteristics of those countries. People have linked the climate of Kashmir to that of Switzerland until the end of May, and of Southern France in July and August. But it is impossible to speak of Kashmir as possessing any one climate or group of characteristics. Every hundred feet of elevation brings some new phase of climate and of vegetation.

Tourism
The Ganderbal district is located in valley of the Sindh River, also known as Nallah Sindh. It is rich in landscape and is often called the District of Lakes, as it possesses the highest number of lakes in the state of Jammu and Kashmir.

Sonamarg

Sonamarg also hosts the International Championships of Rafting on Sindh River. It presents a glamorous look due to its alpine meadows, snow-clad mountains, and healthy climate. Sonamarg skirts Sindh River and torrential flow of water in this river enriches its awesome beauty. Besides several hotels in private sector have come up here and these hotels provide modern facilities to their guests. A number of treks in this region also begin from Sonamarg to high altitude lakes of Vishansar, Krishansar, Gadsar and Gangabal stocked with snow trout and brown trout.

Manasbal Lake

It is located in the Jhelum valley, north of Srinagar city in Jammu and Kashmir. The name Manasbal is said to be a derivative of the Lake Manasarovar. Lake is encircled by three villages: Jarokbal, Kondabal (also called Kiln place; is situated on the north-eastern side of the lake) and Ganderbal and is stated to be the deepest lake (at  depth) in the Kashmir valley. The large growth of lotus (Nelumbo nucifera) at the periphery of the lake (blooms during July and August) adds to the beauty of the clear waters of the lake. The Mughal garden, called the Garoka, (meaning bay window) built by Nur Jahan overlooks the lake.

The lake is a good place for birdwatching as it is one of the largest natural stamping grounds of aquatic birds in Kashmir and has the sobriquet of "supreme gem of all Kashmir Lakes". The rootstocks of lotus plant which grows extensively in the lake are harvested and marketed, and also eaten by the local people.

The lake is approached from Srinagar by a  road via Shadipur, Nasim and Gandarbal. Road to Wular Lake, the largest lake in Kashmir, passes through this lake, via Safapur.

Prang

Prang village is 12 kilometres far from the central hub (beehama) of district Ganderbal, towards the east. Srinagar-Leh National Highway (NH 1D) passes right through the middle of this village. This village falls under the jurisdiction of tehsil Kangan.

Overview 
Prang village is known for its natural and enthralling beauty. The main attraction of this village is its garden, which attracts the tourists throughout the year. This village is also famous for its clear streams, cold air and mighty mountains.

The Prang garden used to be the picnic spot in 1990's before army came and established the base camp there. However, the army camp was later evacuated from the garden in the year 2008. This garden is situated on the banks of the famous Sindh River, and forested slopes are on the other side of the garden adding more charm to its beauty. The famous Environmental park (usually known as the "dumping park") is in the adjacent village of Prang.

This village is considered as the main hub for its adjacent areas. The adjacent areas of this village are "Lari Prang, Check Prang, Herra Prang, Pati Prang and dragtung".

Mohand Marg
Mohand Marg is an alpine meadow in the Lar tehsil. In summer it is a tourist destination for trekking and camping. Sir Aurel Stein was the first person to explore the place, pitching his camp in the summer of 1895.

It is hidden in the mountains to the north of Srinagar at the foot of Haramukh Peaks about 25 kilometers from Srinagar via the Ganderbal road towards Leh. From the road it is accessed via 5 kilometer trek up a steep path through the hill-side settlements and fields of Lar and Chount Waliwar before the 'Marg' opens out across the mountain side giving views of the Sindh Valley far below in one direction and the Valley of Kashmir in the other.

Harmukh

Harmukh is part of the Himalaya Range, and is located between Sindh River to its south and Kishanganga River to its north. It rises above the Gangabal Lake in the vicinity of Kashmir Valley. It is more hazardous to reach Mount Haramukh from the east and south side of Ganderbal and has never been climbed from these sides; thus, it is mostly climbed in the north-west from the Arin Bandipore side.

Harmukh was later climbed by many other climbers. Therefore, Harmukh is the mountain from which the world's second highest mountain peak K2 was discovered and the Serveyer's mark K2 continues to be the name.

Gangabal Lake

Gangabal Lake, also called Gangbal Lake, is a lake situated at the foothills of Mount Haramukh (one of the highest mountain peak in the vicinity of Kashmir valley) in Ganderbal district, north of Srinagar city in Jammu and Kashmir in India. It is an alpine high altitude oligotrophic lake, and is home to many types of fishes of which one is the brown trout.

It is fed by precipitation, glaciers and springs. The lake water outflows to a nearby small lake (Nundkol) and then via Wangath nullah to Sindh River. The trout fishes are present in the lake. Gangabal lake is approached from Srinagar  by road via Ganderbal up to Naranag and then a  track upslope.

Villages
 

Haripora
Nawabagh Ganderbal
Wakura

References

External links
 Official website

 
Districts of Jammu and Kashmir